Jesús Guzmán may refer to:

 Jesús Guzmán (actor) (born 1926), Spanish actor
 Jesús Guzmán (baseball) (born 1984), Venezuelan baseball player
 Jesús Guzmán Delgado (born 1957), Spanish cyclist